Manik Rai is a legendary 7th century rajput king from Ajmer, India.

According to the bardic tradition, Manik Rai was the brother of Dula Rai, the Chauhan king of Ajmer. In 684 CE, he fled from Ajmer after Dula Rai was killed by their enemies. He managed to gain control of the area around Sambhar Lake with the blessings of the goddess Shakambhari.

Historian R. B. Singh identifies Manik Rai as Samantaraja, the 7th century Chahamana ruler of Shakambhari.

References

Bibliography 
 

7th-century Indian monarchs
History of Rajasthan
People from Ajmer
Rajput rulers